Route 75 is a trackless trolley route operated by SEPTA in North and Northeast Philadelphia, Pennsylvania, United States. It connects to the Market–Frankford Line at Arrott Transportation Center Station, and runs primarily along Wyoming Avenue. Route 75 connects to the Wyoming (BSL station) local line and goes to Wayne Junction in Nicetown.

The route is operated by trolleybuses, locally called trackless trolleys, which replaced streetcars (trolley cars) on the route on April 19, 1948, following one day of temporary bus operation. As far back as 1922, the President of Philadelphia Rapid Transit recommended converting the route into a feeder route for the Market-Frankford Line. The route originally continued east from Margaret-Orthodox elevated station to Richmond Street, in the Bridesburg neighborhood, but the last day of operation to Bridesburg was April 2, 1966.

All of the vehicles currently in use are ADA-compliant, and equipped with bicycle racks. Diesel buses temporarily replaced trackless trolleys on route 75 in June 2002, but trackless service was restored in April 2008.

See also

 Trolleybuses in Philadelphia

References

External links
SEPTA Route 75 (Official schedule and map)
Flickr Photo

75
75
75